Adam Maxwell Burton, known professionally as Maxwell Atoms, is an American animator, screenwriter, storyboard artist, and voice actor. He is the creator of the Cartoon Network series Grim & Evil and its subsequent spin-offs, The Grim Adventures of Billy & Mandy and Evil Con Carne. He was born in San Antonio, Texas but he was raised in Colorado Springs, Colorado.

Career
Atoms is the creator of Cartoon Network's animated television series The Grim Adventures of Billy & Mandy, Evil Con Carne, and has developed a Billy & Mandy spin-off Halloween special called Underfist: Halloween Bash. Atoms attended the University of the Arts in Philadelphia. Before he started working on his own series, Atoms was an intern at Film Roman, a freelance artist at Warner Bros., had a brief stint at WildBrain, and had also worked on The Twisted Tales of Felix the Cat. Atoms got a job at Hanna-Barbera and as a story and storyboard artist on Cow and Chicken and I Am Weasel. Atoms also performed the voice of Jeff the Spider and Piff on The Grim Adventures of Billy & Mandy, and voiced Cod Commando on Evil Con Carne. He also voiced several additional characters in the TV-movie Billy & Mandy's Big Boogey Adventure.

Atoms is good friends with fellow animator Mr. Warburton, creator of Codename: Kids Next Door and C. H. Greenblatt, the creator of Chowder and Harvey Beaks. He and Tom have made multiple references to each other's shows and have made a crossover half-hour special, The Grim Adventures of the Kids Next Door. As for C. H., he voiced the character Fred Fredburger in several episodes of Billy & Mandy, alongside a brief cameo of Chowder in Underfist. Atoms was also an executive producer and voice actor of the Disney show Fish Hooks with Noah Z. Jones.

As of 2012, Atoms begun developing a new project entitled Dead Meat, "an awesome black comedy/buddy action/puppet gore web series", which was still in production as of January 2020 and had a successful Kickstarter campaign as of November 15, 2013. In an interview in 2013, Atoms stated that the series would be posted somewhere on the internet once it is finished. In early 2014, Atoms stated that he hopes to get the series released in 2015. This fell through and, in early 2020, Atoms announced that the project is shelved indefinitely and all backers will be refunded due to expensive costs and contractual issues. In 2016 he began working on a new series called Bunnicula. The show ended in 2018.

In 2020, he provided several additional voices for the adult animated web series Hazbin Hotel, as he met creator Vivienne Medrano during work on Dead Meat.

Personal life
Atoms lives in Los Angeles. He has Asperger syndrome.

Filmography

Television

Films

Video games

Internet

Awards
 Special internship, Film Roman. University of the Arts. 1996.
 Annie nomination (1998)- Outstanding Individual Achievement for Storyboarding in an Animated Television Production. Cow & Chicken "The Karate Chick".
 Top Pick Cartoons (2001–02). TV Guide.
 Comic-Con (2005, 2006 and 2007).
 34th Annual Daytime Emmy Awards, Children's Programming, 2007 – The Grim Adventures of Billy & Mandy

Notes

References

External links
 .
 Maxwell Atoms' Blog

American animated film directors
American art directors
American film directors
American film producers
American male screenwriters
American male television writers
American male voice actors
American storyboard artists
American television directors
American television producers
Artists with autism
Cartoon Network Studios people
Hanna-Barbera people
Living people
People from Philadelphia
People with Asperger syndrome
Actors with autism
University of the Arts (Philadelphia) alumni
Year of birth missing (living people)